The 2004–05 season was the 60th season in the existence of Lille OSC and the club's fifth consecutive season in the top flight of French football. In addition to the domestic league, Lille participated in this season's editions of the Coupe de France, Coupe de la Ligue, the UEFA Intertoto Cup and UEFA Cup. The season covered the period from 1 July 2004 to 30 June 2005.

Transfers

In

Out

Competitions

Overview

Ligue 1

League table

Results summary

Results by round

Matches

Coupe de France

Coupe de la Ligue

UEFA Intertoto Cup

UEFA Cup

First round

Group stage

The group stage draw was held on 5 October 2004.

Knockout phase

Round of 32

Round of 16

Statistics

Goalscorers

References

Lille OSC seasons
Lille